In physics, precisely in the study of the theory of general relativity and many alternatives to it, the post-Newtonian formalism is a calculational tool that expresses Einstein's (nonlinear) equations of gravity in terms of the lowest-order deviations from Newton's law of universal gravitation. This allows approximations to Einstein's equations to be made in the case of weak fields. Higher-order terms can be added to increase accuracy, but for strong fields, it may be preferable to solve the complete equations numerically. Some of these post-Newtonian approximations are expansions in a small parameter, which is the ratio of the velocity of the matter forming the gravitational field to the speed of light, which in this case is better called the speed of gravity. In the limit, when the fundamental speed of gravity becomes infinite, the post-Newtonian expansion reduces to Newton's law of gravity.

The parameterized post-Newtonian formalism or PPN formalism, is a version of this formulation that explicitly details the parameters in which a general theory of gravity can differ from Newtonian gravity.  It is used as a tool to compare Newtonian and Einsteinian gravity in the limit in which the gravitational field is weak and generated by objects moving slowly compared to the speed of light. In general, PPN formalism can be applied to all metric theories of gravitation in which all bodies satisfy the Einstein equivalence principle (EEP). The speed of light remains constant in PPN formalism and it assumes that the metric tensor is always symmetric.

History
The earliest parameterizations of the post-Newtonian approximation were performed by Sir Arthur Stanley Eddington in 1922. However, they dealt solely with the vacuum gravitational field outside an isolated spherical body. Ken Nordtvedt (1968, 1969) expanded this to include seven parameters in papers published in 1968 and 1969. Clifford Martin Will introduced a stressed, continuous matter description of celestial bodies in 1971.

The versions described here are based on Wei-Tou Ni (1972), Will and Nordtvedt (1972), Charles W. Misner et al. (1973) (see Gravitation (book)), and Will (1981, 1993) and have ten parameters.

Beta-delta notation

Ten post-Newtonian parameters completely characterize the weak-field behavior of the theory. The formalism has been a valuable tool in tests of general relativity. In the notation of Will (1971), Ni (1972) and Misner et al. (1973) they have the following values:

 is the 4 by 4 symmetric metric tensor with indexes  and  going from 0 to 3.

In Einstein's theory, the values of these parameters are chosen (1) to fit Newton's Law of gravity in the limit of velocities and mass approaching zero, (2) to ensure conservation of energy, mass, momentum, and angular momentum, and (3) to make the equations independent of the reference frame.  In this notation, general relativity has PPN parameters and

Alpha-zeta notation

In the more recent notation of Will & Nordtvedt (1972) and Will (1981, 1993, 2006) a different set of ten PPN parameters is used.

 is calculated from 

The meaning of these is that ,  and  measure the extent of preferred frame effects.

In this notation, general relativity has PPN parameters
 and 

The mathematical relationship between the metric, metric potentials and PPN parameters for this notation is:

 

These metric potentials have forms such as:

which is simply another way of writing the Newtonian gravitational potential,

Stress-energy tensor for a perfect fluid takes form

How to apply PPN

Examples of the process of applying PPN formalism to alternative theories of gravity can be found in Will (1981, 1993). It is a nine step process:

Step 1: Identify the variables, which may include: (a) dynamical gravitational variables such as the metric , scalar field , vector field , tensor field  and so on; (b) prior-geometrical variables such as a flat background metric , cosmic time function , and so on; (c) matter and non-gravitational field variables.
Step 2: Set the cosmological boundary conditions. Assume a homogeneous isotropic cosmology, with isotropic coordinates in the rest frame of the universe. A complete cosmological solution may or may not be needed.
Substitute the perfect fluid stress tensor for the matter sources.
Assuming this tends to zero far from the system, one obtains the form  where  is the Newtonian gravitational potential and  may be a complicated function including the gravitational "constant" . Work in units where the gravitational "constant" measured today far from gravitating matter is unity so set .
This is the messiest step, involving all the nonlinearities in the field equations. The stress–energy tensor must also be expanded to sufficient order.
Step 8: Convert to local quasi-Cartesian coordinates and to standard PPN gauge.

Comparisons between theories of gravity

A table comparing PPN parameters for 23 theories of gravity can be found in Alternatives to general relativity#Parametric post-Newtonian parameters for a range of theories.

Most metric theories of gravity can be lumped into categories. Scalar theories of gravitation include conformally flat theories and stratified theories with time-orthogonal space slices.

Another class of theories is the quasilinear theories such as Whitehead's theory of gravitation. For these .

Another class of metric theories is the bimetric theory. For all of these  is non-zero. From the precession of the solar spin we know that , and that effectively rules out bimetric theories.

Another class of metric theories is the scalar–tensor theories, such as Brans–Dicke theory. For all of these, . The limit of  means that  would have to be very large, so these theories are looking less and less likely as experimental accuracy improves.

The final main class of metric theories is the vector–tensor theories.

There are some metric theories of gravity that do not fit into the above categories, but they have similar problems.

Accuracy from experimental tests
Bounds on the PPN parameters from Will (2006) and Will (2014)

† 

See also

Alternatives to general relativity#Parametric post-Newtonian parameters for a range of theories
Linearized gravity
Peskin–Takeuchi parameter The same thing as PPN, but for electroweak theory instead of gravitation
Tests of general relativity

References

Eddington, A. S. (1922) The Mathematical Theory of Relativity,  Cambridge University Press.
Misner, C. W., Thorne, K. S. & Wheeler, J. A.  (1973) Gravitation, W. H. Freeman and Co.

Will, C. M. (1981, 1993) Theory and Experiment in Gravitational Physics, Cambridge University Press. .
Will, C. M., (2006) The Confrontation between General Relativity and Experiment, https://web.archive.org/web/20070613073754/http://relativity.livingreviews.org/Articles/lrr-2006-3/

Theories of gravity
Formalism (deductive)
General relativity